The Velika Remeta Monastery is a Serbian Orthodox monastery located in the village of Velika Remeta on the mountain Fruška Gora in northern Serbia. It is one of several monasteries of Fruška Gora. Traditionally, its founding is linked to King Stefan Dragutin. The earliest historical records about the monastery date to 1562. It was declared Monument of Culture of Exceptional Importance in 1990, and it is protected by the Republic of Serbia.

Gallery

See also
Monasteries of Fruška Gora - Fruškać
Mala Remeta monastery
Tourism in Serbia
List of Serbian Orthodox monasteries

Sources

References

External links 

Velika Remeta monastery - Fruškać
More about the monastery

Nemanjić dynasty endowments
Cultural Monuments of Exceptional Importance (Serbia)
Serbian Orthodox monasteries in Serbia